Theodor Pool (8 December 1890 Piistaoja (now Tori Parish), Kreis Pernau – 25 August 1942 Sverdlovsk, Russian SFSR) was an Estonian politician, agronomist and writer. He was a member of the Constitutional Assembly of Estonia and of the I, II, III and IV Riigikogu, representing the Estonian Labour Party.

In 1919 he was Minister of Food and Agricultural Affairs and the Minister of Agriculture, from 1920 until 1929. Pool was arrested in 1941 by the NKVD during the first Soviet occupation of Estonia and placed within the Gulag camp system. He was executed by gunshot in Sverdlovsk Oblast the following year.

References

1890 births
1942 deaths
People from Tori Parish
People from Kreis Pernau
Estonian Lutherans
Estonian Labour Party politicians
Agriculture ministers of Estonia
Members of the Estonian Constituent Assembly
Members of the Riigikogu, 1920–1923
Members of the Riigikogu, 1923–1926
Members of the Riigikogu, 1926–1929
Members of the Riigikogu, 1929–1932
Estonian agronomists
Riga Technical University alumni
Estonian military personnel of the Estonian War of Independence
Estonian people executed by the Soviet Union
People who died in the Gulag
People executed by the Soviet Union by firearm
20th-century agronomists